Route 109 or Highway 109 can refer to multiple roads:

Canada
  New Brunswick Route 109
  Prince Edward Island Route 109
  Quebec Route 109

China
  China National Highway 109

Costa Rica
 National Route 109

India
 National Highway 109 (India)

Israel
 Route 109 (Israel)

Philippines
 N109 highway (Philippines)

United States
  U.S. Route 109 (former)
  Alabama State Route 109
  Arkansas Highway 109
  California State Route 109
  Colorado State Highway 109
  Connecticut Route 109
  Florida State Road 109
  Georgia State Route 109
  Illinois Route 109
  Indiana State Road 109
  Iowa Highway 109
  Kentucky Route 109
  Louisiana Highway 109
  Maine State Route 109
  Maryland Route 109
  Massachusetts Route 109
  M-109 (Michigan highway)
  Minnesota State Highway 109
  County Road 109 (Hennepin County, Minnesota)
  County Road 109 (Pine County, Minnesota)
  Missouri Route 109
  Nebraska Highway 109
  Nebraska State Spur 109 (former)
  New Hampshire Route 109
  New Hampshire Route 109A
  New Jersey Route 109
  County Route 109 (Bergen County, New Jersey)
  County Route S109 (Bergen County, New Jersey)
  County Route 109 (Ocean County, New Jersey)
  New Mexico State Road 109
  New York State Route 109
  County Route 109 (Cortland County, New York)
  County Route 109A (Cortland County, New York)
  County Route 109 (Erie County, New York)
  County Route 109 (Fulton County, New York)
  County Route 109 (Madison County, New York)
  County Route 109 (Montgomery County, New York)
  County Route 109 (Onondaga County, New York)
  County Route 109A (Onondaga County, New York)
  County Route 109 (Rockland County, New York)
  County Route 109 (Sullivan County, New York)
  County Route 109 (Tompkins County, New York)
  North Carolina Highway 109
  North Carolina Highway 109A (Thomasville) (former)
  North Carolina Highway 109A (Troy) (former)
  Ohio State Route 109
  Oklahoma State Highway 109
  South Carolina Highway 109
  South Dakota Highway 109
  Tennessee State Route 109
  Texas State Highway 109 (former)
  Texas State Highway 109 (1939) (former)
  Texas State Highway Loop 109
  Farm to Market Road 109
  Utah State Route 109
  Vermont Route 109
  Virginia State Route 109
  Virginia State Route 109 (1923-1928) (former)
  Virginia State Route 109 (1928-1933) (former)
  Virginia State Route 109 (1933-1946) (former)
  Washington State Route 109
  Wisconsin Highway 109

Territories
  Puerto Rico Highway 109

See also
A109
B109 road
D109 road
P109
R109 road (Ireland)